Lifechanyuan International Family Society is a community that was founded in April 2009 by Xuefeng in Yunnan province, China. From 2009 to 2016, it had been called “the Second Home”, which implied that the community was a sweet and harmonious family home apart from each one’s home of origin, and this “Second Home” also applied a new and different lifestyle. From 2009 to 2021, Lifechanyuan established 13 the Second Homes in Yunnan, Jiangsu, Xinjiang, and Guizhou provinces of China. And unfortunately it was forcibly disbanded five times from 2013 to 2021 by the Chinese government.  In 2017 Xuefeng moved to Canada where he set up the Lifechanyuan International Family Society.

Doctrine

Lifechanyuan is the integration of Christianity, Catholicism, Islam, Buddhism, Taoism, science, and Mao Zedong.  It is not a religion, rather a way of life through communal living and through preserving the environment. Lifechanyuan follows the path of the Greatest Creator, and the core values of Lifechanyuan are to revere the Greatest Creator, revere life, and revere nature.  It requires that its members read the Chanyuan Corpus and follow the 800 values for the new era human beings.  There is no marriage allowed in the community.

Chanyuan Celestial's

In order to become a Chanyuan Celestial you must be:

1. a civilized person.

2. a kind person.

3. a wise person.

4. a diligent person.

5. a person with great ideals.

6. a person wanting to be a celestial being.

7. a person who keeps promise.

8. a person who loves to bring delighted, joyful, free and happy life to others.

History

Founding of Lifechanyuan

In 2009, Xuefeng came back to China from Zimbabuwe and established "The Second Home of Lifechanyuan" people group. It had been growing great, with in excess of one hundred and fifty (150) individuals on three ranches in Yunnan Province before it got disbanded by the Chinese government in 2017 In January 2017, in foresight of a promising future, Xuefeng changed the group's name to "Lifechanyuan International Family Society".

Life in the Community

There is no marriage and traditional family as they view it as the deep root of selflishness of individuals and the society. Xuefeng views marriage as an outdated concept. Committed relationships are also not advocated in the community, as everyone needs to grow an independent and mature consciousness in their spiritual growth. Love is a status of LIFE Beings; love is like the sunshine and need to be shared among the all chanyuan celestials, because they are the brothers and sisters that resonating with Chanyuan Values.

Each member works for six to eight hours a day(farming, cleaning, cooking, constructing etc.) and share meals together.  Each member gets his or her own bedroom but shared common space.

Religious syncretism
Religious organizations based in China
2009 establishments in China